Thomas Earl House may refer to:

Thomas Earl House (Napa, California), listed on the National Register of Historic Places in Napa County, California
Thomas Earl House (Ann Arbor, Michigan), listed on the National Register of Historic Places in Washtenaw County, Michigan